Pinepoca is a former settlement in Raleigh County, West Virginia, United States. Pinepoca appeared on USGS maps as late as 1929.

References

Geography of Raleigh County, West Virginia
Ghost towns in West Virginia
Coal towns in West Virginia